The People's Union for Wallis and Futuna is a political party in the French collectivité d'outre-mer of Wallis and Futuna. In the latest legislative elections of March 10, 2002, it won 6 out of 20 seats in the Territorial Assembly.

References

External links
 http://www.france-politique.fr/wiki/Union_Socialiste_pour_Wallis-et-Futuna_(USPWF) 

Political parties in Wallis and Futuna
Socialist parties in France